The William Martin Armistead House is a historic building at 1510 Hyde Park Street in Sarasota, Florida, United States. It was owned by William Martin Armistead who was prominent in the advertising industry. On March 30, 2009, it was added to the U.S. National Register of Historic Places.

References

Houses completed in 1941
Houses on the National Register of Historic Places in Sarasota County, Florida
Houses in Sarasota, Florida
Colonial Revival architecture in Florida
1941 establishments in Florida